UTC Aerospace Systems (UTAS) was one of the world’s largest suppliers of aerospace and defense products, headquartered in Charlotte, North Carolina, United States. The company was formed in August 2012 when parent United Technologies Corporation merged their existing subsidiary Hamilton Sundstrand with the newly-acquired Goodrich Corporation. In 2018, UTC acquired Rockwell Collins which was merged to form Collins Aerospace.

Products

UTC Aerospace Systems was engaged in designing, manufacturing and servicing systems and components for commercial, regional, business and military aircraft, helicopters and other platforms. UTC Aerospace Systems was also a major supplier to international space programs.

UTC Aerospace Systems had two main segments: Aircraft Systems and Power, Control & Sensing Systems. These segments were then broken down into several business units.

The Aircraft Systems consisted of Actuation & Propeller Systems, Aerostructures, Air Management Systems, Interiors, and Landing Systems (formerly Landing Gear and Wheels and Brakes).

The Power, Control & Sensing Systems consisted of Electric Systems, Engine Systems, ISR & Space Systems, and Sensors & Integrated Systems.

UTC Aerospace Systems was also the owner of Ithaco Space Systems, Inc., formerly owned by Goodrich Company. Ithaco has produced items for the field of satellite control since 1962, such as Earth sensors, reaction/momentum wheels, magnetometers and magnetic torquers. In addition to over 100 U.S. satellites, equipment made by Ithaco flew on Japanese, Canadian, French, German, Spanish, Swedish, and Argentinean spacecraft. Ithaco became notable for having manufactured the reaction wheels of the Kepler spacecraft, the Hayabusa spacecraft, the Mesosphere Energetics and Dynamics (TIMED) satellite and the Dawn spacecraft, which developed problems or even failed. The ROSAT reaction wheels lasted over eight years.

UTC Aerospace Systems announced layoffs at Ithaco Space Systems in August 2012 due to Ithaco having been "focused on space programs that have recently seen slower growth", and further layoffs at former Hamilton Sundstrand.

See also
 List of aircraft propeller manufacturers
 LucasVarity
 Pratt & Whitney

References

External links
 UTC Aerospace Systems website

Aerospace companies of the United States
United Technologies
Rocket engine manufacturers
Windsor Locks, Connecticut
Aircraft propeller manufacturers
Aircraft undercarriage manufacturers
Companies based in Charlotte, North Carolina
2018 mergers and acquisitions